Lawrence Lemuel Hernandez Fortun, also known as Law Fortun, (born August 7, 1971) is a Filipino lawyer and politician who is serving as the vice mayor of Butuan since June 30, 2022. He previously served as a member of the House of Representatives of the Philippines representing Agusan del Norte's 1st congressional district from 2013 to 2022.

Early life and education 
Fortun was born on August 7, 1971, in Butuan, the son of Camilo Fortun and Geraldine Hernandez-Fortun. His father was a former member of the Butuan City Council and an opposition leader during the Marcos regime.

He graduated from Father Saturnino Urios University with a degree in political science. He finished his law degree at San Sebastian College – Recoletos and was admitted to the bar in 2001.

Career

Early career 
Before joining politics, he was an active law practitioner in Manila. He also served as Executive Director of the National Institute for Policy Studies and was Legal Consultant to the Department of Education, the Committee on Rules of the House of Representatives, and the Commission on Appointments.

Political career 
Fortun's political career began when he was elected to the Butuan City Council in 2007. Thereafter he was elected Vice Mayor in 2010 and shepherded the Sangguniang Panlungsod of Butuan into passing historic and landmark legislations such as the Butuan City Watershed Code, the Butuan City Public-Private Partnership Code, the Butuan City Gender and Development Code, the Organic Farming Code, the Butuan City Shelter Code and the Ordinance Creating the Persons with Disabilities Office. He introduced the codification, tracking and archiving system that significantly contributed to the transparency and efficiency of the Sanggunian. Under his watch, the Butuan City Council was chosen National Finalist in a Search for Most Outstanding Sangguniang Panlungsod by the Philippine Councilors League (PCL) and the Department of the Interior and Local Government (DILG).

He sought for higher office in the 2013 Philippine general election where he ran and won for a seat in the House of Representatives to represent the 1st District of Agusan del Norte.

Representative Fortun, or Cong. Law as he is fondly called by colleagues, has consistently championed legislations on environment preservation and protection, accessible education, health, social welfare, human rights, rule of law, good governance, transparency, and accountability.

In the current Congress, he was principal author of the newly enacted R.A. No. 11510 or the Alternative Learning System Act and R.A. No. 11643 granting survivorship benefits to families of deceased retirees of the National Prosecution Service.

He also sponsored landmark legislations that were passed on Third and Final Reading including HB 7836, providing stronger protection against rape and sexual abuse and exploitation; HB 8097 reforming the Solo Parents Welfare Act; HB 5869 expanding the Anti-Violence Against Women and their Children Act; HB 8179 or the Sustainable Forest Management Act; HB 5869, or the Expanded Anti-Violence Against Women and their Children (E-VAWC) Act; HB 5989 for the creation of the Department of Disaster Resilience; HB 7036, or the Security of Tenure Act; and HB 9147, or the Single-Use Plastic Products Regulation Act.

Consistent with his advocacies, he has authored and co-authored over 200 bills and resolutions in the 18th Congress including the following:

•	On environment and natural resources, he is the principal author of bills for the establishment of marine protected areas in all coastal towns and cities; prevention of marine pollution from ships; the National Land Use Act; the Alternative Minerals Management Bill; and the National Mangrove Forest Protection and Preservation Act.

•	On education, he filed bills pushing for the Sustainability and Resiliency Studies Act; the Philippine STEAM Act; and the Student Journalists' Rights Act.

•	On health and social welfare, he introduced bills pushing for a comprehensive civil registration reform; benefits and privileges to pregnant women and their families; additional benefits to barangay workers; the magna carta of day care workers; the magna carta of workers in the informal economy; the promotion of social enterprises; the prevention of teenage pregnancy; and stricter regulations on tobacco use and advertisements.

•	On the area of human rights, rule of law, good governance, transparency, and accountability, he principally authored the bill strengthening the Commission on Human Rights; the bill for the equality of men and women under marriage laws; the bill strengthening patients’ rights against hospital detention; the National Government Rightsizing Bill; the Anti-Political Dynasty Bill; the Freedom of Information Bill; and the Whistleblower Protection Bill.

Representative Fortun bravely took positions consistent with rule of law and human rights on several controversial issues in the House. He was among the few Members who voted against the Death Penalty Bill and was the lone dissenter in the Committee on Justice against the bill lowering the minimum age of criminal liability from 15 years old to 9 years of age. In the impeachment proceedings against former Chief Justice Lourdes Sereno, he was one of only four Justice Committee members to oppose the committee’s policy not to allow counsels for the respondent to cross-examine witnesses and resource persons. He also was among the few House members who stood up against the infamous P1,000.00 budget for the Commission on Human Rights saying “Congress should strengthen democratic institutions, not weaken them.” Fortun was one of 20 legislators who introduced a resolution upholding the independence of the Ombudsman at the height of attacks against the Office in 2017. He vigorously opposed the non-renewal of the franchise of ABS-CBN on the ground of press freedom and preservation of jobs of over ten thousand breadwinners in the middle of a pandemic. Asserting fundamental rights and freedoms and adherence to the Constitution, Representative Fortun voted against the Anti-Terror Bill.

Representative Fortun is a Member of the House of Representatives Electoral Tribunal (HRET), a nine-member constitutional body composed of six Representatives and three Supreme Court Justices, mandated by the Constitution to be the sole judge of all contests relating to the election, returns and qualifications of members of the House of Representatives.

He has been chosen part of the five-member contingent of the House of Representatives to two oversight committees constituted jointly with the Senate, namely, the Joint Congressional Oversight Committee on the Visiting Forces Agreement and the Joint Congressional Oversight Committee on the Automated Election Law. In the 17th Congress (2016-2019), he sat in the Joint Congressional Oversight Committee on the Clean Air Act and the Joint Congressional Oversight Committee on the Clean Water Act.

Representative Fortun is also an active member representing the Minority in several important committees, including the Committee on Ways and Means, the Committee on Public Accounts the Committee on Justice, the Committee on Human Rights, the Committee on Ecology, the Committee on Constitutional Amendments, the Committee on Revision of Laws, the Committee on Inter-Parliamentary Relations and Diplomacy and the Committee on the West Philippine Sea.

Interests 
Fortun is a sports enthusiast. He is into running, cycling, badminton and football. He is a member of the Board of Governors of the Philippine Football Federation serving from 2019 to 2023 and President of the Butuan-Agusan Norte Football Association.

Personal life 
Fortun is married to Marie Therese Fontanilla-Fortun. They have three sons.

References 

1971 births
Living people
Members of the House of Representatives of the Philippines from Agusan del Norte
People from Butuan
People from Agusan del Norte
Politicians from Agusan del Norte
Nacionalista Party politicians